The 1999 Rolex 24 at Daytona was a 24-hour endurance sports car race held on January 30–31, 1999 at the Daytona International Speedway road course. The race served as the opening round of the 1999 United States Road Racing Championship. It was the second and final year that the race was sanctioned by the SCCA before being taken over by Grand-Am. 

Victory overall and in the Can-Am class went to the No. 20 Dyson Racing Riley & Scott Mk III driven by Butch Leitzinger, Andy Wallace, and Elliott Forbes-Robinson. Victory in the GT2 class went to the No. 83 Roock Racing Porsche 911 GT2 driven by André Ahrlé, Raffaele Sangiuolo, David Warnock, and Hubert Haupt. The GT3 class was won by the No. 23 Team Seattle/Alex Job Racing Porsche 993 Carrera RSR driven by Kelly Collins, Cort Wagner, Anthony Lazzaro, and Darryl Havens. Finally, the GTT class was won by the No. 19 SK Group Motorsports Ford Mustang Cobra driven by Kyle McIntyre, Gary Stewart, Andy Petery, Craig Carter, and Les Delano.

Race results
Class winners in bold.

External links

Race Results

Car Information & Images

24 Hours of Daytona
1999 in sports in Florida
1999 in American motorsport